Marcel Cadieux,  (June 17, 1915 – March 19, 1981) was a Canadian civil servant and diplomat.

Early life and education
Cadieux was born in Montreal, Quebec. He studied at the Collège André Grasset, obtained a Master's degree in law from the Université de Montréal, and studied constitutional law at McGill University in Montreal.

Career
Cadieux joined the Department of External Affairs in 1941, served as senior adviser to Canadian members of the International Control Commission in Vietnam in 1954, and became the legal advisor to the Department of External Affairs in 1956. 

A professor of international law at the University of Ottawa, he was the first Canadian to sit on the United Nations International Law Commission. From 1964 to 1970, he was Under-Secretary of State for External Affairs. 

Cadieux served on the negotiating committee to determine maritime boundaries with the United States. He was Canada's first francophone Ambassador to the United States from 1970 to 1975, and head of the Canadian Mission to the European Communities from 1975. 

He was appointed to advise the Royal Canadian Mounted Police (RCMP) in 1978. He also wrote several books on Canadian diplomacy.

In 1969, he was made a Companion of the Order of Canada.

Family
He married Anita Comtois, and they had two sons.

References

 Marcel Cadieux at The Canadian Encyclopedia Archived at the Wayback Machine.
 Foreign Affairs and International Trade Canada Complete List of Posts 
 
 The Good Fight: Marcel Cadieux and Canadian Diplomacy by Brendan Kelly, UBC Press, 2019.

1915 births
1981 deaths
Ambassadors of Canada to the United States
Companions of the Order of Canada
McGill University Faculty of Law alumni
People from Montreal
Université de Montréal alumni
International Law Commission officials
Ambassadors of Canada to the European Union
Canadian officials of the United Nations